Zuoying Ciji Temple or Bao Sheng Da Di Temple is a temple by Lotus Lake in Zuoying District, Kaohsiung, Taiwan.

See also
 Baosheng Dadi
 Cide Temple
 Chi Ming Palace
 Zhouzi Qingshui Temple
 Spring and Autumn Pavilions
 List of temples in Taiwan
 Religion in Taiwan

References

Religious buildings and structures in Kaohsiung
Taoist temples in Taiwan
Zuoying District